Kenneth Dale Holtzman (born November 3, 1945) is an American former professional baseball player and coach. He played in Major League Baseball as a left-handed pitcher from  through , most notably as a member of the Chicago Cubs for whom he pitched two no-hitters and, with the Oakland Athletics dynasty that won three consecutive World Series championships between 1972 to 1974. A two-time All-Star, Holtzman was a 20-game-winner for the Athletics in 1973. He also played for the Baltimore Orioles and the New York Yankees. 
 
Holtzman was the first Cubs pitcher in the live-ball era to throw two no-hitters; the next Cubs pitcher to do so was Jake Arrieta 35 years later. In 2007, Holtzman managed the Petach Tikva Pioneers in the Israel Baseball League.

Early and personal life
Holtzman was born in St. Louis, Missouri. He graduated from University City High School in St. Louis in 1963.

Holtzman's skill was very noticeable in his teenage years. In the summer of 1964, Holtzman was pitching against the Geldmacher Sporting Goods "Bandits". According to opponent Jim Fernandez, his curveball "froze him in the batter's box". His MLB potential was clear. Fortunately, the determined Fernandez would get a base hit off the future big leaguer later in the game.

Holtzman is Jewish, and through 2010, his 174 career victories were the most in the major leagues by a Jewish pitcher (ahead of Sandy Koufax). He tied Koufax's record for the most wins by a Jewish pitcher in 1977, and passed him in 1978. Holtzman's 1,601 strikeouts were second (behind Koufax), and his 451 games were second (behind Scott Schoeneweis). He held the record for most pitching appearances by a Jewish pitcher until 1998, when Scott Radinsky passed him to become the major league leader in appearances among Jewish pitchers. His 3.49 ERA was fifth (behind Koufax, Radinsky, Barney Pelty, and Erskine Mayer).

Early career
Holtzman obtained his B.A. in business administration and French from the University of Illinois, and was selected by the Cubs in the fourth round of the 1965 amateur draft.

At age 19, Holtzman pitched only 12 games in the minor leagues in 1965, four with the Treasure Valley Cubs in the Pioneer League, and eight with the Wenatchee Chiefs in the Northwest League. He was 8–3 in the dozen starts, with a 1.99 earned run average and 114 strikeouts in 86 innings. He was called up to the major leagues in September and pitched four innings over three games in relief.

Major league career

Chicago Cubs (1965–1971)
After three relief appearances in September 1965, Holtzman joined the Cubs' starting rotation in 1966, and had an 11–16 rookie campaign as the team finished in last place. The team's fortunes turned around, however, as they had winning years in every season from 1967 through 1971.

As a promising Jewish left-hander, he was heralded as "the new Sandy Koufax." He pitched against Koufax in 1966 on September 25, and took the win by a 2–1 score. Koufax made his last regular-season appearance a week later, on October 2.

Holtzman served in the National Guard in 1967 and was only available to play on weekends. He appeared in 12 games and had a 9–0 record. Through 2006, only four pitchers in baseball history were undefeated with more decisions. With his military obligations behind him, he became a strong second starter behind Ferguson Jenkins, and the Cubs began being successful in the National League for the first time since World War II.

After going 11–14 in 1968, he posted consecutive 17-win seasons. Holtzman was named NL Player of the Month in May 1969 with a 6-0 record, a 2.16 ERA, and 44 strikeouts.

That August 19, he pitched his first no-hitter at Wrigley Field against the eventual Western Division champion Atlanta Braves, winning 3–0 on Ron Santo's three-run home run and outdueling the Braves' Phil Niekro. Holtzman had no strikeouts and three walks in the game. This was the first no-hitter by a Cub left-hander at Wrigley Field and the third no-hitter ever thrown without a strikeout (Earl Hamilton on August 30, 1912; Sad Sam Jones on September 4, 1923), a feat that has not been equaled since. In the seventh inning, Hank Aaron crushed a drive to left field that appeared to be a home run, but the wind held up the ball, enabling Billy Williams to catch the long fly ball in the recessed "well" at the wall in left field. Holtzman faced Aaron again in the ninth, and got him to ground out to second base to complete the no-hitter. The Cubs led the Eastern Division for much of the season before finishing in second place, eight games behind the eventual world champion New York Mets.

In 1970, Holtzman had his best year with the Cubs, with a 17–11 record and a 3.38 ERA, and finished third in the NL in starts (38), fifth in both strikeouts (202) and innings pitched, sixth in complete games (15) and ninth in wins.

On June 3, 1971, Holtzman pitched a no-hitter — the first ever at Riverfront Stadium — against the defending league champion Cincinnati Reds, winning the game 1–0 during what would prove to be his final year with the Cubs. In doing so, he became the first Cubs pitcher since Larry Corcoran (who had three from 1880 to 1884) to have two no-hitters for the team.

Oakland Athletics (1972–1975)

Holtzman asked to be traded at the end of the 1971 season, so he was dealt to the Oakland Athletics in November in exchange for outfielder Rick Monday. Oakland had won the Western division in 1971 but were swept by the Baltimore Orioles in the American League Championship Series. This was just as Oakland began its run of three straight World Series titles.

Joining a staff that featured Vida Blue and Catfish Hunter, he won 19 games in 1972 (7th in the AL) and was named to the All-Star team for the first time. He lost Game 3 of the 1972 American League Championship Series against the Detroit Tigers as opposing pitcher Joe Coleman set an ALCS record with 14 strikeouts. After Oakland won the ALCS in five games, Holtzman won Game 1 of the World Series against the Reds. He started Game 4, but left in the eighth inning with a 1–0 lead and a runner on third base. The Reds scored twice to take the lead, but Oakland scored twice in the ninth inning to win 3–2. He relieved Hunter in the eighth inning of Game 7 with a 3–1 lead but after surrendering a double to Joe Morgan, he was replaced by Rollie Fingers. The A's hung on for a 3–2 win, taking their first Series title since 1930 (when the team was located in Philadelphia).

In 1973, Holtzman led the A's with a 2.97 ERA (6th best in the league) as each of their three top starters won 20 or more games. He was again an All-Star, going 21–13 in 40 starts (his 21 wins 4th-best in the AL) with 157 strikeouts. Over the next 33 years only two other left-handers had as many starts in a season. In the 1973 ALCS against the Baltimore Orioles, he won an 11-inning 2–1 duel against Mike Cuellar in Game 3 when Bert Campaneris homered to lead off the last inning. He started three times in the 1973 World Series against the Mets, winning Game 1 2–1. He lasted only  of an inning in Game 4, departing after a 3-run homer by Rusty Staub, which was followed by two more base runners. He recovered to win Game 7, leaving in the 6th inning with a 5–1 lead as the A's won the game 5–2 and their second straight title. In both his victories, he doubled and also scored the first run for the A's after not having batted all season due to the American League using the designated hitter for the first time in the 1973 season.

Despite posting better or equal numbers with Catfish Hunter in 1973, Holtzman was not among the ten AL pitchers that year to receive votes in Cy Young Award considerations, while Hunter finished third. Holtzman would never earn so much as a single Cy Young or MVP vote in his entire career.

He again won 19 games in 1974, but this time endured 17 losses despite his 3.07 ERA, which ranked 11th in the League. Facing the Orioles in the 1974 ALCS, he pitched a 5–0 shutout in Game 2, taking a one-hitter into the eighth inning and allowing only five singles. Against the Los Angeles Dodgers in the World Series, he started Game 1 but was pulled in the fifth inning with a 2–1 lead; the A's went on to win 3–2. He won Game 4 5–2, hitting a home run off Andy Messersmith in the third inning for a 1–0 lead (the designated hitter was not used in World Series play until 1976). He would be the last pitcher to hit a World Series home run until Joe Blanton in 2008. During the nine seasons in which he batted regularly during the season, he had only two home runs. Oakland won Game 5 and became the first team to win three straight World Series since the New York Yankees won five straight from 1949 to 1953.

After losing in salary arbitration in February, Holtzman had an 18–14 record for the 1975 A's as they won their fifth straight American League Western Division title. On June 8, against the Detroit Tigers, he had what would have been his third career no-hitter broken up with two out in the ninth by a Tom Veryzer double. He would have become the third pitcher (after Cy Young and Jim Bunning) to pitch no-hitters in both leagues. Holtzman lost Games 1 and 3 of the ALCS to the Boston Red Sox as the A's were swept. He was fourth in the AL in games started (38), sixth in hits allowed per 9 innings pitched (7.33), and seventh in wins.

Later career
Paid $93,000 in 1975 and one of nine Oakland players refusing to sign 1976 contracts, Holtzman sought a three-year $460,000 pact. With free agency imminent after the season and the expectations of higher salaries for which Athletics owner Finley was unwilling to pay, he was acquired along with Reggie Jackson and minor-league right-handed pitcher Bill Van Bommel by the Orioles for Don Baylor, Mike Torrez, and Paul Mitchell on April 2, 1976. Disgruntled during his time in Baltimore, he was dealt along with Doyle Alexander, Elrod Hendricks, Grant Jackson and Jimmy Freeman from the Orioles to the New York Yankees for Rick Dempsey, Scott McGregor, Tippy Martinez, Rudy May and Dave Pagan at the trade deadline eleven weeks later on June 15, 1976.

Holtzman posted a 12–10 record for the Yankees over three years, but his playing time was increasingly limited. He did not appear in the 1976 or 1977 postseasons with New York. In June 1978, after making 5 appearances, he was traded by the Yankees to the Chicago Cubs for Ron Davis. He ended his career with Chicago in 1979, going 6–9 with a 4.59 ERA.

Over 15 years, he had a 174–150 record with a 3.49 ERA, 1,601 strikeouts, and 31 shutouts in 451 games and  innings. He held batters to a .220 batting average with 2 outs and runners in scoring position. His 80 victories with Chicago were the fourth most by a left-hander, behind Hippo Vaughn (151), Larry French (95), and Dick Ellsworth (84). He received four votes in Baseball Hall of Fame voting in 1985, and 5 in 1986.

Later years
Holtzman went on to attempt a career as an insurance salesman. He also worked for the St. Louis Jewish Community Center, running the gymnasium in the Marilyn Fox Building. He coached the St. Louis baseball team for the Maccabi games for a few years and is a member of the Chicagoland Sports Hall of Fame.

Managing career
Holtzman managed the Petach Tikva Pioneers in the inaugural 2007 season of the Israel Baseball League, but was fired before the season ended. The Pioneers finished the 2007 regular season in last place (9–32; .220) and lost to the Modi'in Miracle in the quarterfinals of the 2007 championship.

See also
 List of select Jewish baseball players

References

Further reading
 Bike, William S. The Forgotten 1970 Chicago Cubs: Go and Glow (2021). The History Press. ISBN 978-1467149082.
 This chapter in Ruttman's history, based on a June 21, 2007 interview with Holtzman conducted for the book, discusses Holtzman's American, Jewish, baseball, and life experiences from youth to the present.

External links

Ken Holtzman — Baseball Biography
International Jewish Sports Hall of Fame
Jewish Major Leaguers: Career leaders
The Baseball Page

1945 births
Living people
American League All-Stars
Baltimore Orioles players
Baseball players from St. Louis
Chicago Cubs players
Illinois Fighting Illini baseball players
Israel Baseball League managers
Jewish American baseball players
Jewish Major League Baseball players
Major League Baseball pitchers
New York Yankees players
Oakland Athletics players
Stockbrokers
Treasure Valley Cubs players
University of Illinois Urbana-Champaign alumni
Wenatchee Chiefs players
21st-century American Jews